Beynac-et-Cazenac is a village located in the Dordogne department in southwestern France.

The medieval Château de Beynac is located in the commune.

The village is classified as one of Les plus beaux villages de France (most beautiful villages of France).

Geography

History
Historically the first mention of Beynac dates to 1115 when Maynard de Beynac made a gift to the sisters at Fontevrault Abbey. Simon de Montfort seized the château at the end of the 12th century, but the people of Beynac recovered their château thanks to the intervention of Philippe Auguste in 1217. The château stayed in possession of the family de Beynac until 1753 when the de Beynac family  became extinct in male line with Pierre last marquis of Beynac who married in 1727 Anne-Marie Boucher and had two daughters : Julie de Beynac  married to the marquis de Castelnau and Claude-Marie de Beynac married in 1761 to Christophe Marie de Beaumont du Repaire. The family de Beaumont du Repaire added "Beynac" to its name and took the courtesy title of "marquis de Beaumont-Beynac" One of the descendants sold the château in 1961.

In 1827, the communes of Beynac and Cazenac were merged under the current name.

Population

See also
 Communes of the Dordogne département

References

External links

 Beynac-et-Cazenac website, in English
 Beynac-et-Cazenac on the site of Les Plus Beaux Villages de France, in English
 Beynac-et-Cazenac accommodation, in English
 Official Beynac-et-Cazenac website, in French

Communes of Dordogne
Plus Beaux Villages de France